The Ve people live in the Hohoe district of the Volta region of Ghana. They celebrate the Dodoleglime festival.

References

 

Volta Region